Blooming Grove Township is one of thirteen townships in Franklin County, Indiana. As of the 2010 census, its population was 1,154.

History
Blooming Grove Township was largely settled after the War of 1812.

Geography
Shady Lake is in this township.

Unincorporated towns
 Blooming Grove
 Pinhook
(This list is based on USGS data and may include former settlements.)

Adjacent townships
 Harmony Township, Union County (northeast)
 Fairfield Township (east)
 Brookville Township (southeast)
 Metamora Township (southwest)
 Laurel Township (west)
 Jackson Township, Fayette County (northwest)

Major highways
 Indiana State Road 1

Cemeteries
The township contains one cemetery, Ebenezer.

Education
Blooming Grove Township residents may obtain a free library card from the Franklin County Public Library District in Brookville.

References
 
 United States Census Bureau cartographic boundary files

External links
 Indiana Township Association
 United Township Association of Indiana

Townships in Franklin County, Indiana
Townships in Indiana